The Circle 7 logo is an often-used television station logo in the United States. Designed in the early 1960s for the American Broadcasting Company's five owned-and-operated stations (all of which broadcast on VHF channel 7), the logo, or a version of it, is currently being used not only by several ABC stations and affiliates, but also by a number of television broadcasters around the world.

History and information 

The Circle 7 logo was created by G. Dean Smith, a San Francisco graphic designer, and was first used in 1962 by ABC as the logo for its (then) five owned-and-operated television stations: WABC-TV in New York City; KABC-TV in Los Angeles; WBKB (now WLS-TV) in Chicago; KGO-TV in San Francisco; and WXYZ-TV in Detroit. When ABC applied for television station licenses in the late 1940s, it was thought that the low-band channel frequencies (2 through 6) would be removed from use for television broadcasting, thus making these five stations broadcasting on VHF channel 7 the lowest on the television dial; those plans never came to pass. American Broadcasting-Paramount Theatres, ABC's then-corporate parent, registered the Circle 7 logo with the U.S. Patent and Trademark Office in 1962.

When WABC-TV adopted the Eyewitness News format in January 1968, all reporters and anchors were required to wear a blazer with a Circle 7 patch (a lapel pin in later years) when they appeared on the air – a marketing practice that spread to the other ABC O&Os, and eventually to other ABC affiliates. Stations commonly used the logo on microphone flags, newscaster clothing and design of sets, as well as on-air graphics for locally originated programming. 

Circle Seven Animation, a short-lived (2005-2006) division of ABC parent company Disney that was working on sequels to Disney-owned Pixar films, was indirectly named after the logo, as its studios were located on Circle Seven Drive in Glendale, California, a street which was renamed for the logo when KABC-TV moved its studios there.

U.S. stations currently using the Circle 7 logo or a variant

1WZVN is operated through an LMA by Waterman Broadcasting Corporation.

Non-U.S. use
 In Australia, Seven Network affiliate ATN-7 used the "Circle 7" logo from 1968 to 1969 with customized versions across the network from 1970 to 2000.
 In Malaysia, this logo was adopted by NTV7 from 2001 until March 5, 2018. 
 In Peru, RTP (now TV Perú) adopted this logo in 1989 and used it until 1991.
 In the Philippines, GMA (also known as DZBB-TV) used the logo from 1961 until 1974 when it was dropped due to Marcos' martial law and the handover to new owners. The logo stayed until the latter part of the decade.
 In Indonesia, TV7 used the stylized Circle 7 logo from its launch in November 2001 until its relaunch as Trans7 in December 2006.
 In Brazil, RecordTV adopted the logo in 1965 and used it until 1970.
 In Bermuda, ABC affiliate ZFB-TV uses the Circle 7 logo, although the station refers to being branded by cable channel 7 rather than actual virtual channel (station is on Channel 19).
 In Turkey, Kanal 7 used the Circle 7 logo since 2002, The circle in the logo is slightly oval and leg of digit 7 through the circle.

See also
American Broadcasting Company logos
Enclosed Alphanumerics, a section of Unicode that includes circle-IRP dingbats (e.g. ➆)

References

Sources

"New '7' logo designed for KGO-TV (ch.7)" (PDF file), Broadcasting, August 27, 1962, p. 72.
"Designed Symbols for AT&T, ABC Stations Dean Smith; Corporate Logo Creator", Los Angeles Times, March 28, 1987

American Broadcasting Company
Local television programming in the United States
Commercial logos
Symbols introduced in 1962